Kim Sam-soo (born 8 February 1963) is a South Korean football midfielder who played for South Korea in the 1986 FIFA World Cup. He also played for Hyundai Horang-i and Lucky-Goldstar Hwangso.

References

External links
 
FIFA profile

1963 births
South Korean footballers
South Korea international footballers
Association football midfielders
Ulsan Hyundai FC players
FC Seoul players
Busan IPark players
K League 1 players
1986 FIFA World Cup players
Living people
Asian Games medalists in football
Footballers at the 1986 Asian Games
Asian Games gold medalists for South Korea
Medalists at the 1986 Asian Games
Sportspeople from Daejeon